is a railway station on the Ainokaze Toyama Railway Line in the city of Kurobe, Toyama, Japan, operated by the third-sector railway operator Ainokaze Toyama Railway.  It is also a freight terminal for the Japan Freight Railway Company.

Lines

Station layout 
Kurobe Station has one ground-level side platform and one ground-level island platform connected by a footbridge. The station is staffed.

Platforms

Adjacent stations

History
It was renamed Kurobe Station on 10 April 1956. With the privatization of Japanese National Railways (JNR) on 1 April 1987, the station came under the control of JR West.

From this date, Kurobe Station was transferred to the ownership of the third-sector operating company Ainokaze Toyama Railway.

Passenger statistics
In fiscal 2015, the station was used by an average of 1,249 passengers daily (boarding passengers only).

Surrounding area 
 YKK Makino factory
 Kurobe Public Hospital

See also
 List of railway stations in Japan

References

External links

  

Railway stations in Toyama Prefecture
Stations of Japan Freight Railway Company
Railway stations in Japan opened in 1910
Kurobe, Toyama